Vementry (Old Norse: "Vemunðarey") is an uninhabited Scottish island in Shetland on the north side of the West Mainland, lying south of Muckle Roe.

Description and history 
The island is known for its well-preserved chambered cairn.

They were manned by a mixed crew of RN sailors and Royal Marines. The guns are mounted en barbette on concrete platforms with a  concrete parapet and gun shield to provide protection against incoming fire. There are two ammunition lockers built into the parapet of each gun platform, and each platform is linked to a separate main magazine by a trench. A simple stone-and-concrete fire control pillbox also exists on the site. The guns were abandoned in situ after the end of the First World War and were never used after this time.

Mainland and island 
Vementry is also the name of a small farm on Mainland, Shetland, immediately south of the island. For this reason, it is sometimes referred to as the "Isle of Vementry". There is no ferry service to the island, although the shepherd on the mainland farm occasionally makes the short trip to work with stock on the island.

The Isle of Vementry is separated from the mainland Vementry by a narrow channel or "sound", consisting of Uyea Sound to the east and Cribba Sound to the west. Cribba Sound is famed for the quality of mussels produced at the mussel farms located there.

References

Uninhabited islands of Shetland
Neolithic Scotland
Former populated places in Scotland